Philander Prescott (September 17, 1801 – August 10, 1862) was the son of Dr. Joel Prescott and Phildelia Reed.  He was a native of Phelps, Ontario County, New York. He headed west in the spring of 1819, stopping a few months in Detroit, Michigan, before continuing west to Fort Snelling.

In 1823, he married Na-he-no-Wenah (Spirit of the Moon), also known as Mary Ke E Hi, daughter of Man-Who-Flies, a Dakota subchief who lived near Lake Calhoun. She was born around 1804–1806 and died on March 29, 1867, at Shakopee, Minnesota. They had sons, William Prescott; Hiram Prescott (born December 21, 1831 or 1832); and Lorenzo Taliferro Prescott (c. 1839 – January 2, 1869); as well as a daughter, Lucy Prescott Pettijohn; and two more children.

During his life on the frontier, he served as a government interpreter of the Dakota language (including for the Treaty of Traverse des Sioux). He worked as a miner, a trapper, and on a steamboat on the Mississippi River. He also ran trading posts, in several locations, and farmed.

From 1839 to 1862, he operated a trading post along the St. Croix River - its location became the town of Prescott, Wisconsin, named for him.

He was killed at the Lower Sioux (or Redwood) Agency during the Dakota War of 1862; he was buried in the Minneapolis Pioneers and Soldiers Memorial Cemetery, as were his wife and son.

His papers are in the Minnesota Historical Society library.

See also 

 Attack at the Lower Sioux Agency

Notes

References
The Recollections of Philander Prescott, Frontiersman of the Old Northwest, 1819-1862. Edited by Donald Dean Parker.  University of Nebraska Press, Lincoln, 1966 full text of book here

External links
Coming to Detroit
Prescotts in History
Prescott's time at Flandreau, MN
His house at Fort Snelling

People from Phelps, New York
People from Prescott, Wisconsin
Dakota War of 1862
1801 births
1862 deaths
19th-century American translators